USS Erie may refer to the following ships of the United States Navy:

 , a sloop-of-war, launched in 1813 and served until 1850
 USS Erie was the initial name of a collier launched in 1908 and converted to the repair ship  in 1913
 , a gunboat launched in 1936 and sunk in 1942

See also
 

United States Navy ship names